The Eagles–Giants rivalry is a National Football League (NFL) rivalry between the Philadelphia Eagles and New York Giants. The rivalry began in 1933 with the founding of the Eagles, and slowly strengthened when both teams came to relative prominence in the 1940s and 1950s. The two teams have played in the same division in the NFL every year since 1933, making it the second-oldest rivalry in the NFC East division, behind only New York's rivalry with the Washington Commanders. The ferocity of the rivalry can also be attributed to the geographic New York-Philadelphia rivalry, which is mirrored in Major League Baseball's Mets–Phillies rivalry and the National Hockey League's Flyers–Rangers rivalry. It is ranked by NFL Network as the number one rivalry of all-time and Sports Illustrated ranks it amongst the top ten NFL rivalries of all-time at number four, and according to ESPN, it is one of the fiercest and most well-known rivalries in the football community.

The overall series is currently led by the Eagles, 93–88–2. The Eagles and Giants have met in the playoffs five times, with the Eagles leading 3–2.

Notable rivalry moments

The Hit: 1960

In a November 20, 1960, game, the Eagles' Chuck Bednarik cleanly blindsided Giants running back Frank Gifford in a play known as The Hit, widely considered the hardest, or one of the hardest, tackles in the history of the National Football League that sent Gifford to the ground unconscious. He was removed from the field by stretcher, transported to a hospital by ambulance, and diagnosed with a severe concussion. The play forced Gifford out of the game for 18 months before he was ultimately able to return with the Giants.

The Miracle at the Meadowlands/The Fumble: 1978

On November 19, 1978, at Giants Stadium, the Giants were leading the Eagles 17–12 with 20 seconds remaining. Offensive coordinator Bob Gibson called for a running play when all that was needed was for the Giants to take a knee. The handoff between quarterback Joe Pisarcik and Larry Csonka was fumbled and Eagles cornerback Herman Edwards grabbed the loose ball and returned it for the winning score. This play is commonly referred to as The Miracle at the Meadowlands by Eagles fans and just "The Fumble" by Giants fans.

1981 NFC wild card game
In 1981, both the Giants and the defending NFC champion Eagles qualified for playoff berths. The Eagles hosted the Giants on December 27 in a wild card game. The Giants, led by quarterback Scott Brunner and head coach Ray Perkins, took a 20–0 lead in the first quarter. The Eagles rallied but never led and the Giants held on to win 27–21. The game ended with Scott Brunner kneeling down on the ball, which was revenge for the Joe Pisarcik game some three years earlier. The Giants would go on to lose 38-24 to the San Francisco 49ers, the eventual Super Bowl XVI champions.

1988 division title
The 1988 NFL season saw both teams competing for the NFC East title. On November 20, 1988, the Giants hosted the Eagles with both teams in the running for control over their division. The Eagles, led by head coach Buddy Ryan and quarterback Randall Cunningham, fought a tough match to bring the game into overtime with the score tied at 17–17. In overtime, Eagles defensive lineman Clyde Simmons carried the ball 15 yards after a blocked Eagles field goal attempt for the game-winning touchdown, completing a season sweep of the Giants. Both teams finished with 10–6 records, but the Eagles won the NFC East due to their head-to-head victories, while the Giants lost the wild card tiebreaker to the Los Angeles Rams and missed the playoffs. The Eagles would lose to the Chicago Bears in a game famously known as the Fog Bowl.

2000 NFC divisional game
On January 7, 2001, the Giants defeated the Eagles 20–10 in a divisional playoff game with the help of Ron Dixon's 97-yard kickoff return and Jason Sehorn's acrobatic 32-yard interception return. This win helped propel the Giants to Super Bowl XXXV, which they lost to the Baltimore Ravens, 34–7.

2006 NFC wild card game
On January 7, 2007, the Eagles defeated the Giants 23-20 in a wild card playoff game on a David Akers field goal as time expired. The Eagles had relinquished a ten-point lead in the fourth quarter, with the Giants tying the game on a touchdown by Plaxico Burress with just over five minutes remaining. Jeff Garcia and Brian Westbrook led the game-winning drive deep into Giants territory, allowing the Eagles to drain the clock to three seconds before Akers lined up his 38-yard kick to win the game.

2008 NFC Divisional Game
The two teams split their 2008 meetings. The Giants rallied to edge the Eagles in Philadelphia 36–31, then the Eagles stymied New York's offense en route to a 20–14 win in New York. They met again on January 11, 2009, in the 2008 NFC Divisional Playoffs in New York, and the #6 seeded Eagles defeated the top-seeded Giants 23–11, leaving the series tied 2–2 in the all-time playoff series.

Miracle at the New Meadowlands: 2010

On December 19, 2010, the Giants led the Eagles 31–10 with 7:28 left in the first game between the teams at New Meadowlands Stadium where first place in the NFC East was on the line. But the Eagles rallied to tie the score and then won the game on DeSean Jackson's 65 yard punt return for a touchdown with no time left on the clock for a 38–31 victory. The Elias Sports Bureau noted that this is the first walk-off punt return in NFL history. The Giants missed the playoffs, despite finishing tied for first with the Eagles at 10–6, and the Eagles lost their last two games.

Other notable moments
On December 18, 1994, the Giants beat the Eagles at Veterans Stadium, giving them their fifth consecutive win after starting 3–7, while giving the Eagles their sixth consecutive loss of the season after a 7–2 start. This led to the firing of Philadelphia's then-head coach Rich Kotite after the season's conclusion.
 On October 31, 1999, at Veterans Stadium in overtime, Eagles' quarterback (and future head coach) Doug Pederson had his pass blocked up in the air and was intercepted by Michael Strahan and returned for a 44-yard touchdown to win the game for the Giants 23–17.
 In Week 6 of the 2001 season, the Eagles broke a nine-game losing streak against the Giants. James Thrash caught the winning touchdown from Donovan McNabb in the fourth quarter.
 In week 2 of the 2006 season, the Giants met the Eagles in Philadelphia and were down 24-7 by the end of the 3rd quarter. In the 4th quarter of regulation the Giants responded with two more touchdowns and a field goal to tie the game 24-24 and go into overtime. In overtime the Giants defeated the Eagles when quarterback Eli Manning threw a 31 yard pass to Plaxico Burress.
 On September 30, 2007, the Giants sacked Eagles quarterback Donovan McNabb 12 times (tying an NFL record) en route to a 16-3 win. New York's defense held the Eagles scoreless in the first half, while in the second quarter, New York got on the board first with quarterback Eli Manning completing a 9-yard touchdown pass to wide receiver Plaxico Burress. In the third quarter, the Giants increased their lead with kicker Lawrence Tynes getting a 29-yard field goal, along with linebacker Kawika Mitchell returning a fumble 17-yards for a touchdown. In the fourth quarter, the Eagles would get their only points of the game with kicker David Akers making a 53-yard field goal. Later that year, in the 2007 playoffs, New York would go on to defeat the 18-0 unbeaten New England Patriots in Super Bowl XLII.
 On October 12, 2014, the Eagles authored their first shutout win in the series since 1996, winning 27–0.  Quarterback Nick Foles threw for 248 yards and two touchdowns while he and three Eagles running backs rushed for 203 yards, led by LeSean McCoy's 149 yards.  The Giants failed on a fourth and goal attempt in the third quarter following a Foles interception; even worse, wide receiver Victor Cruz suffered a season-ending injury on the play. (This led to an off-field episode in the rivalry, as the cover of the next morning's New York Daily News showed a cheering Eagles employee and the fallen Cruz under the headline "PHILTHY!", implying that the man was celebrating the injury rather than the result of the play.)  Eli Manning was held to 151 yards and backup Ryan Nassib connected for 60 yards.
 On September 24, 2017, in Philadelphia, kicker Jake Elliott kicked a 61-yard field goal to beat the New York Giants with no time on the clock for the final play of the game, resulting in a 27–24 victory. Previously regarded as nothing more than a replacement kicker for injured Caleb Sturgis, the kick earned Elliott NFC Special Teams Player of the Week honors, cementing him as a strong kicking option for the 2017 Eagles. Elliott's kick set an Eagles' franchise record for the longest field goal, tied for the 7th-longest field goal in NFL history, and was the longest since November 2015. Elliott helped the Eagles to their first Super Bowl victory later that season in Super Bowl LII.
On January 3, 2021, with the Giants having won earlier in the day, they needed the Eagles, who were eliminated from playoff contention, to defeat the Washington Football Team in order to for the Giants to clinch the NFC East division. The Eagles lost to Washington; Washington rallied from down 14-10 to win 20-14 thus giving them the NFC East title and eliminating the Giants from the playoffs. Eagles head coach Doug Pederson was criticized for benching struggling rookie Jalen Hurts and was questioned in some media circles on how hard his team played. The loss advanced the Eagles three spots in the 2021 NFL Draft to sixth.
On March 26, 2021, after it was alleged that the Eagles tanked in their week 17 game to moved up three spots in the draft, the Eagles traded with the Dolphins to move down to the 12th overall pick. While the Eagles gained a 2022 first-round pick from the trade, this made many Giants fans angry since trading back seemingly removed any good reason for the Eagles to have tanked in week 17 in spite of any leverage gained from the higher draft position contributing to the trade being completed. Leading up to the 2021 NFL Draft, the Giants were sitting at 11th overall. As the draft went on, it was suspected that the Giants would draft wide receiver and 2020 Heisman Trophy winner DeVonta Smith. However, the Eagles traded in-division with Dallas to move up to the 10th overall pick and drafted Smith, which reportedly made the Giants front office "livid.” The Eagles' trade-up resulted in the Giants trading down to the 20th pick with the Chicago Bears, and they would select Florida wide receiver Kadarius Toney.

Season-by-season results 

|-
| 
| style="| 
| style="| Giants  20–14
| style="| Giants  56–0
| Giants  2–0
| Eagles join the NFL. Both teams placed in the NFL Eastern division as the league splits into two divisions. Giants lose 1933 NFL Championship.
|-
| 
|Tie 1–1
| style="| Eagles  6–0
| style="| Giants  17–0
| Giants  3–1
| Giants win 1934 NFL Championship.
|-
| 
| style="| 
| style="| Giants  21–14
| style="| Giants  10–0
| Giants  5–1
| Giants lose 1935 NFL Championship.
|-
| 
| Tie 1–1
| style="| Eagles  10–7
| style="| Giants  21–17
| Giants  6–2
| Eagles move to John F. Kennedy Stadium (then known as Philadelphia Municipal Stadium).
|-
| 
| style="| 
| style="| Giants  16–7
| style="| Giants  21–0
| Giants  8–2
| 
|-
| 
| Tie 1–1
| style="| Eagles  14–10
| style="| Giants  17–7
| Giants  9–3
| Giants win 1938 NFL Championship.
|-
| 
| style="| 
| style="| Giants  13–3
| style="| Giants  37–10
| Giants  11–3
| Giants lose 1939 NFL Championship.
|-

|-
| 
| style="| 
| style="| Giants  20–14
| style="| Giants  17–7
| Giants  13–3
| Eagles move to Connie Mack Stadium.
|-
| 
| style="| 
| style="| Giants  24–0
| style="| Giants  16–0
| Giants  15–3
| Giants lose 1941 NFL Championship.
|-
| 
| style="| 
| style="| Giants  14–0
| style="| Giants  35–17
| Giants  17–3
| Giants win 9 straight meetings (1938–1942).
|-
| 
| Tie 1–1
| style="| "Steagles"  28–14
| style="| Giants  42–14
| Giants  18–4
| Eagles and Pittsburgh Steelers merge for the 1943 season to become the "Steagles," as both teams lost many players to military service during World War II. Giants win 11 straight home meetings (1933–1943).   
|-
| 
| style="| 
| Tie  21–21
| style="| Eagles  24–17
| Giants  18–5–1
| Eagles win their first ever game at New York. Giants lose 1944 NFL Championship.
|-
| 
| Tie 1–1
| style="| Eagles  38–17
| style="| Giants  28–21
| Giants  19–6–1
|-
| 
| Tie 1–1
| style="| Eagles  24–14
| style="| Giants  45–17
| Giants  20–7–1
| Giants lose 1946 NFL Championship. 
|-
| 
| style="| 
| style="| Eagles  23–0
| style="| Eagles  41–24
| Giants  20–9–1
| Eagles sweep Giants for the first time. Eagles lose 1947 NFL Championship.
|-
| 
| style="| 
| style="| Eagles  45–0
| style="| Eagles  35–14
| Giants  20–11–1
| Eagles win 1948 NFL Championship.
|-
| 
| style="| 
| style="| Eagles  17–3
| style="| Eagles  24–3
| Giants  20–13–1
| Eagles win 1949 NFL Championship.
|-

|-
| 
| style="| 
| style="| Giants  9–7
| style="| Giants  7–3
| Giants  22–13–1
| 
|-
| 
| style="| 
| style="| Giants  23–7
| style="| Giants  26–24
| Giants  24–13–1
| 
|-
| 
| Tie 1–1
| style="| Giants  31–7
| style="| Eagles  14–10
| Giants  25–14–1
| 
|-
| 
| Tie 1–1
| style="| Eagles  30–7
| style="| Giants  37–28
| Giants  26–15–1
| 
|-
| 
| Tie 1–1
| style="| Eagles  29–14
| style="| Giants  27–14
| Giants  27–16–1
| 
|-
| 
| Tie 1–1
| style="| Eagles  27–17
| style="| Giants  31–7
| Giants  28–17–1
| 
|-
| 
| style="| 
| style="| Giants  21–7
| style="| Giants  20–3
| Giants  30–17–1
| Giants move to Yankee Stadium, win 1956 NFL Championship.
|-
| 
| style="| 
| style="| Giants  24–20
| style="| Giants  13–0
| Giants  32–17–1
| 
|-
| 
| Tie 1–1
| style="| Eagles  27–24
| style="| Giants  24–10
| Giants  33–18–1
| Eagles move to Franklin Field. Giants lose 1958 NFL Championship.
|-
| 
| Tie 1–1
| style="| Eagles  49–21
| style="| Giants  24–7
| Giants  34–19–1
| Giants lose 1959 NFL Championship.
|-

|-
| 
| style="| 
| style="| Eagles  31–23
| style="| Eagles  17–10
| Giants  34–21–1
| Philadelphia's Chuck Bednarik's hard hit on New York's Frank Gifford causes a key fumble in the Eagles' win in New York, allowing the Eagles to take the division. This hit went on to be known as "The Hit" and caused Gifford to miss most of two seasons. Eagles win 1960 NFL Championship.
|-
| 
| Tie 1–1
| style="| Eagles  28–24
| style="| Giants  38–21
| Giants  35–22–1
| Giants lose 1961 NFL Championship.
|-
| 
| style="| 
| style="| Giants  29–13
| style="| Giants  19–14
| Giants  37–22–1
| Giants lose 1962 NFL Championship.
|-
| 
| style="| 
| style="| Giants  37–14
| style="| Giants  42–14
| Giants  39–22–1
| Giants lose 1963 NFL Championship.
|-
| 
| Tie 1–1
| style="| Eagles  38–7
| style="| Giants  23–17
| Giants  40–23–1
| 
|-
| 
| style="| 
| style="| Giants  16–14
| style="| Giants  35–27
| Giants  42–23–1
|
|-
| 
| style="| 
| style="| Eagles  35–17
| style="| Eagles  31–3
| Giants  42–25–1
| 
|-
| 
| style="| 
| no game
| style="| Giants  44–7
| Giants  43–25–1
| NFL expansion results in a split of each conference into two divisions. The Eagles are placed in the Capitol Division, while the Giants and New Orleans Saints alternate between the Capitol and Century Divisions each year. This results in only a single meeting between the Giants and Eagles in 1967 and 1969.
|-
| 
| style="| 
| style="| Giants  34–25
| style="| Giants  7–6
| Giants  45–25–1 
| 
|-
| 
| style="| 
| no game
| style="| Eagles  23–20
| Giants  45–26–1  
| 
|-

|-
| 
| Tie 1–1
| style="| Eagles  23–20
| style="| Giants  30–23
| Giants  46–27–1  
| Both teams placed in the NFC East after AFL-NFL merger.
|-
| 
| style="| 
| style="| Eagles  23–7
| style="| Eagles  41–28
| Giants  46–29–1
| Eagles open Veterans Stadium.
|-
| 
| style="| 
| style="| Giants  27–12
| style="| Giants  62–10
| Giants  48–29–1 
| Giants 62 points is the most scored by any team in the rivalry. They are also the most points scored in Giants history and the most points allowed in Eagles history.
|-
| 
| style="| 
| style="| Eagles  20–3
| Tie  23–23
| Giants  48–30–2
| 
|-
| 
| style="| 
| style="| Eagles  35–7
| style="| Eagles  20–7
| Giants  48–32–2
| Giants home game played at the Yale Bowl in New Haven, Connecticut.
|-
| 
| Tie 1–1
| style="| Giants  23–14
| style="| Eagles  13–10
| Giants  49–33–2 
| Giants home game played at Shea Stadium in New York.
|-
| 
| style="| 
| style="| Eagles  20–7
| style="| Eagles  10–0
| Giants  49–35–2
| Giants open Giants Stadium in East Rutherford, New Jersey. 
|-
| 
| style="| 
| style="| Eagles  17–14
| style="| Eagles  28–10
| Giants  49–37–2
| 
|-
| 
| style="| 
| style="| Eagles  20–3
| style="| Eagles  19–17
| Giants  49–39–2
| Eagles' win in East Rutherford dubbed the "Miracle at the Meadowlands". Eagles earn first playoff berth since 1960 with home win in Week 17 and help.
|-
| 
| style="| 
| style="| Eagles  23–17
| style="| Eagles  17–13
| Giants  49–41–2
| 
|-

|-
| 
| style="| 
| style="| Eagles  35–3
| style="| Eagles  31–16
| Giants  49–43–2
| Eagles lose Super Bowl XV.
|-
| 
| Tie 1–1
| style="| Giants  20–10
| style="| Eagles  24–10
| Giants  50–44–2
| Eagles win 12 straight meetings (1975–1981), and win 8 straight away meetings (1974–1981).
|- style="background:#f2f2f2; font-weight:bold;"
|  1981 Playoffs
| style="| 
| style="| Giants  27–21
| 
|  Giants  51–44–2
|  NFC Wild Card playoffs – First postseason meeting in the rivalry.
|-
| 
| style="| 
| style="| Giants  26–24
| style="| Giants  23–7
| Giants  53–44–2 
| Both games played despite the players strike reducing the season to 9 games.
|-
| 
| Tie 1–1
| style="| Giants  23–0
| style="| Eagles  17–13
| Giants  54–45–2
| 
|-
| 
| Tie 1–1
| style="| Eagles  24–10
| style="| Giants  28–27
| Giants  55–46–2
| 
|-
| 
| style="| 
| style="| Giants  16–10(OT)
| style="| Giants  21–0
| Giants  57–46–2 
| 
|-
| 
| style="| 
| style="| Giants  17–14
| style="| Giants  35–3
| Giants  59–46–2 
| Giants win Super Bowl XXI.
|-
| 
| style="| 
| style="| Giants  20–17
| style="| Giants  23–20(OT)
| Giants  61–46–2 
| 
|-
| 
| style="| 
| style="| Eagles  24–13
| style="| Eagles  23–17(OT)
| Giants  61–48–2
|
|-
| 
| style="| 
| style="| Eagles  21–19
| style="| Eagles  24–17
| Giants  61–50–2
| 
|-

|-
| 
| Tie 1–1
| style="| Eagles  31–13
| style="| Giants  27–20
| Giants  62–51–2
| Eagles hand 10–0 Giants their first loss in Philadelphia. Giants win Super Bowl XXV.
|-
| 
| style="| 
| style="| Eagles  30–7
| style="| Eagles  19–14
| Giants  62–53–2
| 
|-
| 
| style="| 
| style="| Eagles  20–10
| style="| Eagles  47–34
| Giants  62–55–2
| 
|-
| 
| style="| 
| style="| Giants  7–3
| style="| Giants  21–10
| Giants  64–55–2
| 
|-
| 
| style="| 
| style="| Giants  16–13
| style="| Giants  28–23
| Giants  66–55–2
| 
|-
| 
| style="| 
| style="| Eagles  28–19
| style="| Eagles  17–14
| Giants  66–57–2
| 
|-
| 
| style="| 
| style="| Eagles  24–0
| style="| Eagles  19–10
| Giants  66–59–2
|  
|-
| 
| style="| 
| style="| Giants  31–21
| style="| Giants  31–17
| Giants  68–59–2
|   
|-
| 
| style="| 
| style="| Giants  20–10
| style="| Giants  20–0
| Giants  70–59–2
| 
|-
| 
| style="| 
| style="| Giants  23–17(OT)
| style="| Giants  16–15
| Giants  72–59–2
| Michael Strahan scores game-winning touchdown on a pick-six.
|-

|-
| 
| style="| 
| style="| Giants  33–18
| style="| Giants  24–7
| Giants  74–59–2
| Giants lose Super Bowl XXXV.
|- style="background:#f2f2f2; font-weight:bold;"
|  2000 Playoffs
| style="| 
| 
| style="| Giants  20–10
|  Giants  75–59–2
|  NFC Divisional playoffs. Giants win 9 straight meetings (1997–2000). Ron Dixon's 97-yard return for a touchdown on the opening kickoff set the tone for the Giants as they lead wire-to-wire.
|-
| 
| style="| 
| style="| Eagles  24–21
| style="| Eagles  10–9
| Giants  75–61–2
| Eagles clinch the NFC East for the first time since 1988 at home over the Giants in Week 16 after the Giants' desperation lateral attempt from Tiki Barber to Ron Dixon came up short inside the Eagles' 10-yard line as time expired.
|-
| 
| Tie 1–1
| style="| Eagles  17–3
| style="| Giants  
| Giants  76–62–2
| First season series split since 1990. Giants' home win clinched wild card berth while preventing the Eagles from clinching home-field advantage on their own.
|-
| 
| style="| 
| style="| Eagles  28–10
| style="| Eagles  14–10
| Giants  76–64–2
| Eagles open Lincoln Financial Field. Eagles away win is best remembered for Brian Westbrook's 84-yard punt return with 1:30 remaining and the Eagles having no timeouts down 10–7 turns the Eagles' season around after starting 2–3 and begins a 9-game winning streak.
|-
| 
| style="| 
| style="| Eagles  31–17
| style="| Eagles  27–6
| Giants  76–66–2
| Eagles lose Super Bowl XXXIX.
|-
| 
| style="| 
| style="| Giants  26–23(OT)
| style="| Giants  27–17
| Giants  78–66–2
|
|-
| 
| Tie 1–1
| style="| Giants  30–24(OT)
| style="| Eagles  36–22
| Giants  79–67–2
| Giants overcome 17-point deficit in the fourth quarter in their win in Philadelphia.
|- style="background:#f2f2f2; font-weight:bold;"
|  2006 Playoffs
| style="| 
| style="| Eagles  23–20
| 
|  Giants  79–68–2
|  NFC Wild Card playoffs. David Akers kicks game-winning field goal as time expired after the Giants' rallied from a 20–10 deficit to pull even with about 5 minutes remaining falls just short.
|-
| 
| style="| 
| style="| Giants  16–13
| style="| Giants  16–3
| Giants  81–68–2
| Giants win Super Bowl XLII. Currently last season the Giants have swept the Eagles head-to-head.
|-
| 
| Tie 1–1
| style="| Giants  36–31
| style="| Eagles  20–14
| Giants  82–69–2
| 
|- style="background:#f2f2f2; font-weight:bold;"
|  2008 Playoffs
| style="| 
| 
| style="| Eagles  23–11
|  Giants  82–70–2
|  NFC Divisional playoffs. Eagles become first ever #6 seed in the NFC to defeat the NFC's #1 seed in the last playoff game played at Giants Stadium.
|-
| 
| style="| 
| style="| Eagles  40–17
| style="| Eagles  45–38
| Giants  82–72–2
| Game in East Rutherford was the highest scoring game in the rivalry.
|-

|-
| 
| style="| 
| style="| Eagles  27–17
| style="| Eagles  38–31
| Giants  82–74–2
| Giants and Jets open MetLife Stadium (then known as New Meadowlands Stadium). Eagles' DeSean Jackson has a game-winning 65–yard punt return touchdown in the closing seconds in East Rutherford, dubbed the "Miracle at the New Meadowlands". Capping off the Eagles scoring the final 28 points in the last 8 minutes of regulation after trailing 31–10 to in essence gain a stranglehold for the NFC East with a one-game lead plus a tiebreaker with two games remaining.
|-
| 
| Tie 1–1
| style="| Giants  29–16
| style="| Eagles  17–10
| Giants  83–75–2
| Giants win Super Bowl XLVI.
|-
| 
| Tie 1–1
| style="| Eagles  19–17
| style="| Giants  42–7
| Giants  84–76–2
| Giants victory over the Eagles in the Meadowlands was Andy Reid's last game as Eagles' head coach.
|-
| 
| Tie 1–1
| style="| Giants  15–7
| style="| Eagles  36–21
| Giants  85–77–2
| 
|-
| 
| style="| 
| style="| Eagles  27–0
| style="| Eagles  34–26
| Giants  85–79–2
| 
|-
| 
| style="| 
| style="| Eagles  27–7
| style="| Eagles  35–30
| Giants  85–81–2
| Eagles victory over the Giants in the Meadowlands was Tom Coughlin's last game as Giants' head coach.
|-
| 
| Tie 1–1
| style="| Eagles  24–19
| style="| Giants  28–23
| Giants  86–82–2
| 
|-
| 
| style="| 
| style="| Eagles  27–24
| style="| Eagles  34–29
| Giants  86–84–2
| Eagles kicker Jake Elliott kicks a 61 yard field goal in Philadelphia, an Eagles franchise record, which reminiscent to the dramatic win in 2003, ignites the Eagles in beginning a 9-game winning streak. Eagles win Super Bowl LII.
|-
| 
| style="| 
| style="| Eagles  25–22
| style="| Eagles  34–13
| Tie  86–86–2
| 
|-
| 
| style="| 
| style="| Eagles  23–17(OT)
| style="| Eagles  34–17
| Eagles  88–86–2
| Eagles take the lead in the overall series with the Giants for the first time. Eagles clinch the NFC East with win in East Rutherford in Week 17. Eli Manning's final season.
|-

|-
| 
| 
| style="| Eagles  22–21
| style="| Giants  27–17
| Eagles  89–87–2
| Eagles win 8 straight meetings (2016–20).
|-
| 
|
| style="| Eagles  34–10
| style="| Giants  13–7
| Eagles  90–88–2
| 
|-
| 
| style="| 
| style="| Eagles  22–16
| style="| Eagles  48–22
| Eagles  92–88–2
| Eagles clinch playoff berth in their win in the Meadowlands. Eagles clinch the NFC East & the NFC's #1 seed in their win in Philadelphia.
|- style="background:#f2f2f2; font-weight:bold;"
|  2022 Playoffs
| style="| 
| style="| Eagles  38–7
|
|  Eagles  93–88–2
|  NFC Divisional playoffs. Eagles defeat the Giants for the 10th straight time at Lincoln Financial Field. Eagles’ 28–0 halftime lead is the largest halftime lead in the rivalry. Eagles lose Super Bowl LVII.
|-

|-
| Regular season
| style="| Eagles 90–86–2
| Eagles 52–36–1
| Giants 50–38–1
|
|-
| Postseason
| style="| Eagles 3–2
| Eagles 2–1
| Tie 1–1
| NFC Wild Card playoffs: 1981, 2006. NFC Divisional playoffs: 2000, 2008, 2022
|-
| Regular and postseason 
| style="| Eagles 93–88–2
| Eagles 54–37–1
| Giants 51–39–1
| 
|-

Rivalry outside football 
 The 2006 film Invincible follows Vince Papale (Mark Wahlberg) and his rise to playing for the Eagles. He crushes on a coworker, who, being from New York, is a Giants fan, and in his breakout game, the Eagles play the Giants when he recovers a muffed punt for a touchdown.
 The 2009 film Big Fan depicts a Giants fan (Patton Oswalt) and his bitter rivalry with an Eagles fan (Michael Rapaport).
 After winning the NFC championship on January 29, 2023, the Empire State Building lit up to celebrate the Eagles making the Super Bowl. This sparked outrage from many people in New York, including mayor Eric Adams.

See also 

 Mets–Phillies rivalry
 Flyers–Rangers rivalry
 Devils–Flyers rivalry
 Cowboys–Eagles rivalry
 Commanders–Giants rivalry
 Commanders–Eagles rivalry
 Cowboys–Giants rivalry

References

Inline citations

Bibliography
 

National Football League rivalries
Philadelphia Eagles
New York Giants
New York Giants rivalries
Philadelphia Eagles rivalries